A dud is an ammunition round or explosive that fails to fire or detonate, respectively. 

Dud or Dudd may also refer to:

People
Dudd (died between 781 and 785), Bishop of Winchester
William Odell Dud Bascomb (1916–1972), American jazz trumpeter
Dudley Dud Beattie (1934–2016), Australian rugby league footballer
Edgar Dudley Dud Branom (1897–1980), American Major League Baseball infielder
Dudley DeGroot (1899–1970), American athlete and college and National Football League head coach
Dudd or Dud Dudley (1600–1684), English metallurgist, soldier, military engineer and munitions supplier
William Dudley Dud Lastrapes (born 1929), American businessman and politician - see List of mayors of Lafayette, Louisiana
Ernest Dud Lee (1899–1971), American backup Major League Baseball infielder
Dudley Dud Millard (1901–1954), Australian rugby league player
Dudley Perkins (motorcyclist) (1893–1978), American champion motorcycle hillclimb competitor and Harley-Davidson motorcycle dealer
Dudley Richards (1932–1961), American figure skater
Yuri Dud (born 1986), Russian sports editor

Fictional characters
Dud, played by Dudley Moore - see Pete and Dud
Dudley A. "Dud" Wash, one of The Darlings, recurring characters in the TV series The Andy Griffith Show
Dudd, in Glumpers, a Spanish animated TV series

Other uses 
Duds, a 1920 American silent mystery film
Der Blindgänger, or The Dud, a 2004 short German film by Andreas Samland
Dud, a village in the commune of Târnova, Arad, Romania
dud, ISO 639-3 code for the Hun-Saare language of Nigeria
DUD, IATA code for Dunedin Airport, Dunedin, New Zealand
Slang for clothing

See also
Milk Duds, a candy
, a US Navy floating derrick
Dud Murra of Wadai (the lion of Murra), last independent ruler of the Wadai Empire (1901–1909)

Lists of people by nickname
Hypocorisms